Bredwardine Castle was sited in the village of Bredwardine in Herefordshire, England beside the River Wye. Thought to have been built in the second half of the 12th century. By the 15th century it had become a ruin.

History

Early Norman Manor 
Following the time of the Norman Conquest the manor was granted to John de Bredwardine.

12th Century Castle 
It is thought that the castle was built in the second half of the 12th century. By 1227 the castle had become the property of the Baskerville family. In the following century it was held by Hugh de Lacy.

Refortification and dismantling 
Bredwardine Castle was rebuilt as a fortress during the wars of Stephen and Maud but then dismantled in the reign of Henry II or Henry III. In the middle of the 15th century the castle was described as being a "waste site with no annual value".

The ruined castle and manor passed from the Baskerville family to the Vaughan family. Roger Vaughan was the son in law of Dafydd Gam and converted the castle and manor into a multi-gabled house. Currently, only traces of the stone can be found on the walls of the tower.

See also
Castles in Great Britain and Ireland
List of castles in England

References

Castles in Herefordshire
Ruined castles in England